Dryden-Louthan House is a historic home located at Palmyra, Marion County, Missouri.  It was built in 1858, and is a two-story, Italianate style burnt-sienna-colored brick dwelling. It has low hipped roofs and cornices ornamented by paired, elaborately scrolled brackets.

It was added to the National Register of Historic Places in 1985.

References

Houses on the National Register of Historic Places in Missouri
Italianate architecture in Missouri
Houses completed in 1858
Buildings and structures in Marion County, Missouri
National Register of Historic Places in Marion County, Missouri